Giri Kanye is a 1977 Indian Kannada-language drama film directed by the Dorai–Bhagavan duo. It is based on the novel Girikannika by Bharathisutha. The film stars Rajkumar, Jayamala and Vajramuni. The film was a musical blockbuster with all the songs composed by Rajan–Nagendra considered evergreen hits. The movie saw a theatrical run of 25 weeks. Rajinikanth was initially selected to play the villain's role which was eventually played by Vajramuni.

Cast 
 Rajkumar as Chenna
 Jayamala as Cheluvi
 Vajramuni
 Thoogudeepa Srinivas
 Tiger Prabhakar
 Sampath
 Venkatraju
 Shanthamma
B. Jaya

Soundtrack 

The music of the film was composed by Rajan–Nagendra with lyrics by Chi. Udaya Shankar. All the songs composed for the film were received extremely well. The song "Thai Thai Bangari" was remixed in Ashoka (2003) starring Shivarajkumar who sang the remix.

References

External links 
 

1970s Kannada-language films
1977 drama films
1977 films
Films based on Indian novels
Films scored by Rajan–Nagendra
Indian drama films
Films directed by Dorai–Bhagavan